Discula testudinalis a species of small land snail, a terrestrial pulmonate gastropod mollusk in the family Geomitridae.

Distribution
This species occurs in Portugal (Madeira).

Shell description
The shell of these snails is shaped like a discus, or a lens, with a sharp edge around the periphery of the whorls.

Conservation status
This species is critically endangered, as mentioned in annex IV of Habitats Directive.

References

Discula
Gastropods described in 1853
Taxobox binomials not recognized by IUCN